William J. Green may refer to:
William J. Green, Jr. (1910–1963), U.S. Representative from Pennsylvania
William J. Green, III (born 1938), mayor of Philadelphia
Bill Green IV, also known as William J. Green, IV (born 1965), city council of Philadelphia

See also
William Green (disambiguation)